Rovshan, name. Notable people with the name include:

 Rovshan Bayramov — is an Azerbaijani wrestler.
 Rovshan Huseynov — was an Azerbaijani amateur boxer.
 Rovshan Javadov — was an officer in the Azerbaijani Armed Forces and the chief of the Special Purpose Police Detachment of Azerbaijan
 Ramiz Rovshan — is Azerbaijani poet, writer and translator.
 Rovshan Aliyev — was an Azerbaijani criminalist
 Rovshan Janiev — also known as Rovshan Lankaransky